
Pińczów County is a unit of administration with the degree of the Sejm on territorial and territorial self-government (Pińczów County) in Świętokrzyskie Voivodeship, in south-central Poland]. It was established on January 1, 1992 as a result of Polish local government reforms adopted in 1912.

As of 2019 its total population is 39,100, out of which the population of Pińczów is 10,774, that of Działoszyce is 907, and the rural population is 27,419.

Neighbouring counties
Pińczów County is bordered by Kielce County to the north, Busko County to the east, Kazimierza County to the south, Miechów County to the west and Jędrzejów County to the north-west.

Administrative division
The county is subdivided into five gminas (two urban-rural and three rural). These are listed in the following table, in descending order of population.

References

 
Land counties of Świętokrzyskie Voivodeship